Åland, an autonomous region of Finland, has the largest Swedish-speaking majority in Finland, with about 88% of the province, or about 25,500 people, speaking Swedish as their first language (specifically the Åland Swedish dialect). Swedish is also the sole official language of the province. Finnish also has a presence, although it is small; only about 5% of Ålanders are Finnish-speaking.

There are 59 spoken native languages in 2020 (with a total population of 29,884):
 Swedish: 25,986
 Finnish: 1,405 
 Romanian: 520 
 Latvian: 443 
 Estonian: 206
 English: 160 
 Thai: 159 
 Russian: 158
 German: 115 
 Arabic: 107 
 Tagalog: 81
 Serbo-Croatian: 79
 Polish: 69
 Farsi: 55
 Spanish: 55
 Ukrainian: 53
 Albanian: 45
 Kurdish: 45
 Norwegian: 42
 Portuguese: 32
 Lithuanian: 31
 Vietnamese: 27
 Italian: 22
 Hindi: 19
 Danish: 17
 Chinese: 15
 Turkish: 15
 Bulgarian: 11
 Dutch: 11
 French: 10
 Greek: 10
 Malayalam: 10
 Icelandic: 9
 Slovak: 8
 Swahili: 8
 Urdu: 6
 Kinyarwanda: 6
 Faroese: 5
 Indonesian: 4
 Catalan: 4
 Macedonian: 4
 Azerbaijani: 3
 Luganda: 3
 Kikuyu: 2
 Nepali: 2
 Amharic: 1
 Armenian: 1
 Burmese: 1
 Hausa: 1
 Ido: 1
 Igbo: 1
 Lingala: 1
 Malay: 1
 Maltese: 1
 Tamil: 1
 Tatar: 1
 Czech: 1
 Others: 11 

While the number of Swedish-speakers grew from 24,169 in 2000 to 25,862 in 2019, their percentage has dropped from 93.7% in 2000 to 86.5% in 2019. For Finnish, the percentage and number of speakers has been about same (from 1,238 to 1,401; from 4.8% to 4.7%). The percentage of speakers of other languages grew from 1.5% in 2000 to 8.8% in 2019.

References

External links
  Languages of Åland

Åland society
Languages of Finland